Monique Kiene (born 5 August 1974) is a former professional tennis player from the Netherlands.

Biography
Kiene, a right-handed player from Purmerend, played on the professional tour in the early 1990s. 

She won her first professional tournament in 1991, at the $25k ITF event in Sofia.

In 1992, she partnered with compatriot Miriam Oremans to win her only title on the WTA Tour, in the doubles at the Linz Open. Later in the year she was a semifinalist at the Prague Open, which helped her singles ranking peak at No. 123 in the world.

She played her final year on tour in 1993. At the 1993 Australian Open, she featured in the singles main draw and beat Germany's Maja Živec-Škulj in the first round, before losing her next match to Lindsay Davenport. On 8 February 1993 she reached a career high doubles ranking of 61. She was drawn up against second seed Arantxa Sánchez Vicario in the first round of the 1993 French Open but played a competitive match. After losing the first set, she led the Spaniard 4–0 in the second, before losing the match in a tiebreak.

WTA career finals

Doubles: 1 (title)

ITF finals

Singles (1–1)

References

External links
 
 

1974 births
Living people
Dutch female tennis players
People from Purmerend
Sportspeople from North Holland